Harlan H. Vincent is an American politician who is a member-elect of the New Mexico House of Representatives for the 56th district. Elected in November 2022, he will assume office on January 1, 2023.

Career 
Vincent served in the Ruidoso Fire Department, including as chief, until retiring in 2016. As chief, Vincent also served as commander of the Ruidoso Emergency Operation Center and chair of the Sierra Blanca Wild Land Fire Academy. He was elected to the New Mexico House of Representatives in November 2022 and will assume office on January 1, 2023.

References 

Living people
Republican Party members of the New Mexico House of Representatives
People from Ruidoso, New Mexico
People from Lincoln County, New Mexico
American firefighters
American fire chiefs
Year of birth missing (living people)